Abigail "Abby" Hayes is the main character in many children's fiction books, called The Amazing Days of Abby Hayes. She lives a normal life with a successful and supportive family and many friends. Abby aspires to be like her older siblings, Isabel and Eva. Isabel and Eva always fight. She also has a younger brother named Alex. Each of her siblings excel in a variety of fields. Abby is shown to be a natural swimmer, poor in math while rich in literature. Just because she excels in writing, she still feels incomparable to her siblings, though her older sisters envy her hair, and her brother looks up to her. In That's the Way the Cookie Crumbles, Abby is a talented baker. She is willing to break the rules at times but only when she feels she needs to. She wants to attend a writing camp next summer. Abby is an Amazing role model for young girls.

Abby's friends and relationships play a major role in her life, as well as her love for animals, like cats and dogs. She and Isabel own a kitten named T-Jeff, a kitten she had once taken in secretly when she found him in Look Before You Leap but was permitted to keep him officially when her parents found out. Abby's favorite color is purple. Abby's favorite thing to do is write in her journal. Her favorite grade school teacher is Ms. Bunder, her creative writing teacher. Her favorite middle school teacher is Ms. Bean, her art teacher, who also happens to be good friends with Ms. Bunder.

A distinguishing characteristic of Abby is her curly red hair and blue eyes. She hopes to become a writer, journalist, or writing teacher someday. Her major love interest is Simon, a saxophone player a year older than she is who goes to her school.

Jobs

Abby is an editor for The Daisy, her school's literary journal. She has one of the most important jobs and is the only sixth grader on the staff.

She used to be "band manager's assistant" for the school band, the Jazz Tones. She had been nicknamed "Curly Red" and had done daring jobs. When choosing between The Daisy and the Jazz Tones, Abby felt it was too pointless to stay, even for Simon, so she quit, much to the displeasure of the band director.

In Have Wheels, Will Travel, Abby takes care of her neighbor Heather's cat, Marshmallow, for a week while Heather is in London.

The only other "job" Abby has had is shown in Super Special #1- The Best is Yet to Come, when she takes care of Wynter, the daughter of Olivia Hayes's college roommate, Laurie. Laurie takes advantage of Abby by making her babysit the difficult Wynter for a week and refuses to pay Abby until Abby's mom finds out and kicks her out of the house, giving Abby the money she deserved.

Friends and acquaintances
Jessica "Jessy" is Abby's former best friend. She was fond of space and science. She is fairly tall and her mother is divorced. In Out of Sight, Out of Mind, she moves in with her father and his new wife and stepdaughters in Oregon, changing into a boy crazy girly-girl. She starts wearing skimpy outfits and even gets a boyfriend. Abby claims that although Jessy is still friendly, she is a completely different person from the old Jessica. 
Ian is Jessy's boyfriend. He takes her to  cool parties and is very popular.  
Natalie  is an acquaintance of Abby who she meets at the beginning of fifth grade. Along with Jessica, they were best friends, but Bethany becomes Natalie's best friend after Jessica moves away. However, Natalie and Abby still remain close. In middle school, her personality changes completely: Natalie was messy in fifth grade, but by "Knowledge is Power" is seen to be neat and sleek. She wears hip clothes and acts bored a lot. She plays the clarinet in the Jazz Tones and has a brother named Nicolas. Before she changed, Natalie was a huge fan of chemistry, fantasy, and Harry Potter. After Abby quits her job with the Jazz Tones, she and Natalie become "just friends" and now rarely spend time with each other. 
Bethany is one of Abby's good friends. She loves animals (especially hamsters), is a vegetarian, and used to be Brianna's personal cheerleader, saying "Yay, Brianna!" all the time. After she declares independence from her in "The More The Merrier", she becomes a good friend of Natalie. However, in "Now You See It, Now You Don't", she strangely reverts to being Brianna's cheerleader again, though she and Abby remain friends. She is also a talented gymnast. She owns a lop rabbit and a hamster named Blondie.
Hannah is Abby's current best friend. They met at a Fourth of July picnic. Hannah is much like Jessica, with similar long brown hair and big brown eyes. She is neat, understanding, friendly, tall, and a bit annoying at times. She always has a solution for everything and has many good ideas. However, she doesn't always understand Abby, as seen in "It's Music To My Ears". Hannah has an over-the-top positive attitude and never talks badly about anybody. In "Sealed With A Kiss", Abby mentions that she thinks Hannah might have a bit of a crush on Casey, though she denies it. Hannah has a little sister named Elena. 
Brianna is one of the most popular girls in school and a major show-off. She likes to brag excessively, which includes reminding everyone she is the best and she only has the fanciest of things. In "Home Is Where The Heart Is", Abby actually becomes Brianna's neighbor. She has a younger sister, as revealed in "Reach for the Stars", and a cousin named Clara, who Abby meets in "What Goes Up Must Come Down". In the first book, it is revealed that her last name is Bauer.
 Victoria is a mean, obnoxious friend of Brianna. When Abby trips on the first day of health class and loses her clip-on earring, Victoria calls her the "One Earring Wonder." She and Brianna met during the 5th grade science fair. Her trademark word is "like".  
 Sophia is a shy, artistic girl who is another of Abby's current friends. Sophia likes to draw, and is on the school newspaper staff as the artist.
 Simon is Abby's former crush. He is in seventh grade, plays the saxophone, and is very popular. He has brown hair that falls over his face, blue eyes, and according to Abby he is "dreamy". He is athletic, a good student, and very polite. He only sees Abby as a friend and barely an acquaintance, much to her dismay. In "All That Glitters isn't Gold", it is mentioned that Abby and Simon are just friends, and she no longer has a crush on him. 
 Casey Hoffman is Abby's friend from elementary school who she meets during the science fair. In elementary school they were teased and called "lovebirds". Although a regular character in the middle books, he does not appear as often in some of the later series. Abby suspects that Casey likes Hannah and vice versa.
 Mason is a good friend of Abby's, nicknamed "the Big Burper" for his burping talent. Short and pudgy in elementary, he has grown taller and slimmer by the time middle school begins. He helps Abby out by helping her sell cookies on school grounds, though it is against school rules.  Mason has an older sister named Kathleen, who pierced Abby's ears for her. It is shown in Have Wheels, Will Travel that he has a younger brother. Mason has a crush on Abby, but she is not interested and wants to remain friends. Mason still has hopes of Abby falling for him someday.
 Zach was the computer whiz of 5th grade. He has blond hair, blue eyes, and long dark eyelashes. He was once described by Abby as cute, but "a zombie" when hooked up to a game station. Brianna liked him in elementary school, much to his dismay.
 Tyler was Zach's best friend. Also a computer whiz, Bethany liked him in fifth grade (mostly due to Brianna liking Zach).
Mira is a girl Abby meets in Everything New Under the Sun. She attends the same bookmaking workshop as Abby and Cleo, and becomes friends with them.

Family

Eva is Abby's freshman older sister and Isabel's twin. Abby calls her one of her 'SuperSibs'. Eva loves sports and athletics are all she ever thinks of, but when she breaks her arm in Have Wheels, Will Travel, she learns to be less stubborn. Eva currently has a very shy boyfriend named Stephan as of Sealed With A Kiss.
Isabel is Abby's older sister and Eva's twin, another 'SuperSib'. She is a freshman and very intelligent, who loves history (especially wars) and nail polish. She starred in plays in middle school and always dresses fashionably. She is a keen debater.
Alex is Abby's younger brother, who is in second grade but can already build robots. He is a master at video games and a computer whiz. He loves to play chess. He also looks up to Abby.
Olivia Hayes is Abby's mother. She is a lawyer and a person who would do anything to ensure the best for her kids. It is because of her job promotion that the Hayeses all move to a new house in Home is Where the Heart Is.
Paul Hayes is Abby's father. He runs his own business from his office in their home. He always tries to help the kids out when they feel uncomfortable, such as when he takes their side during Laurie's visit in The Best Is Yet To Come.
Grandma Emma is Abby's favorite grandma who is always sending Abby new calendars. When she is invited to go spend time with Grandma, the answer's an excited "YES!"
Cleo is Abby's cousin. In "Everything New Under the Sun", Abby meets her when they both go to stay with Grandma Emma. She is stuck-up and rude to Abby at the beginning of the book, but warms up to her later after a fight between the two goes nowhere and they start laughing at how ridiculous they were. She enjoys dancing and drama, has traveled a lot, and is quite girly.

Journal
Abby has kept a journal since just before fourth grade. The novels contain traditional third-person writing intermixed with portions of Abby's journal written in the first person. Since Abby's favorite color is purple, she writes in purple ink until "Everything New Under The Sun", when she informs her readers how she ran out of her signature purple ink (but that won't affect her love for writing). She adds calendar quotes to almost every entry, including some that she makes up. Abby loves to write, especially in her journal, and wants to become an author.

School

Fifth Grade
In the fifth grade, Abby goes to Lancaster Clark Elementary School. Abby's favorite teacher is her creative writing teacher, Ms. Bunder, who gave her the nickname "Purple Hayes".  Ms. Bunder comes to Abby's class every Thursday.  Ms. Kantor is her homeroom teacher who is new to the school, having moved from Swiss Hill Elementary. Abby's best friends are Jessica and Natalie; Jessica moves away soon after. One day,  Jessica comes back from where her dad lives for work and meets Abby, but Abby is not much satisfied with Jessica.

Sixth Grade
Abby goes to Susan B. Anthony Middle School. One of her favorite teachers, Ms. Bean, works as an art teacher; she is similar to and friends with Ms. Bunder. Abby matures in the sixth grade. Abby had the courage to get pierced ears on her own, and she has a new sense of funky punky fashion. She makes a very shy new friend, Sophia, who is very good at art.

The Abby Hayes series
 Every Cloud Has A Silver Lining 
 The Declaration of Independence 
 Reach for the Stars!                                                                  
 Have Wheels, Will Travel
 Look Before You Leap! 
 The Pen Is Mightier Than the Sword 
 Two Heads Are Better Than One 
 The More, the Merrier
 Out of Sight, Out of Mind
 Everything New Under the Sun 
 Too Close for Comfort 
 Good Things Come in Small Packages 
 Some Things Never Change
 Super Special 1: The Best Is Yet To Come
 Super Special 2: Knowledge Is Power
 It's Music to My Ears 
 Now You See It, Now You Don't 
 That's the Way the Cookie Crumbles
 Home is where the Heart is 
 What Goes Up Must Come Down  
 All that Glitters isn't Gold 
 Sealed with a  Kiss

References

External links 
 Scholastic Web Page

Literary characters introduced in 2000
Characters in American novels of the 21st century
Fictional reporters
Child characters in literature